The 2020 Spanish Athletics Championships was the 100th edition of the national championship in outdoor track and field for Spain. It was held on 12 and 13 September at various locations, due to restrictions during the COVID-19 pandemic. 

The club championships in relays and combined track and field events were contested separately from the main competition.

Venues

Results

Men

Women

Notes

References
Results
100 Campeonato de España Absoluto . Royal Spanish Athletics FederationRetrieved 2021-03-23.

External links 
 Official website of the Royal Spanish Athletics Federation 

2020
Spanish Athletics Championships
Spanish Championships
Athletics Championships